HMS Gabriel was a  flotilla leader of the British Royal Navy, that took part in the First World War. The ship was built by Cammell Laird at Birkenhead, being launched on 23 December 1915 and entering service in July 1916. Gabriel served with the Grand Fleet, leading a destroyer flotilla and was later used as a minelayer. She survived the war, before being sold for scrap on in May 1921.

Construction and design
In November 1914, as part of the Emergency War Programme of shipbuilding, the British Admiralty ordered three s (i.e. large destroyers intended to lead flotillas of smaller destroyers in action) from the Birkenhead shipyard Cammell Laird. The first of these three ships, HMS Gabriel (originally to be named Abdiel) was laid down on 12 January 1915 and was launched on 23 December 1915. The construction of the three Marksman-class ships by Cammell Laird was problematical, with the ships suffering machinery problems and construction delays, with the Admiralty complaining to Lairds that "better workmanship and supervision" were needed for Ithurial and Gabriel, which were 8 months behind programme. Gabriel was to continue to suffer from machinery problems throughout her career. Gabriel was commissioned on 1 July 1916.

The design displacement was  normal and  full load. Four funnels were fitted. The ship's crew was 104 officers and men.

Gabriel was armed with four QF  Mk IV guns mounted on the ships centreline, with two 2-pounder (40-mm) "pom-pom" anti-aircraft guns and four 21 inch (533 mm) torpedo tubes.

Service
On commissioning, Gabriel joined the 13th Destroyer Flotilla of the Grand Fleet, serving as leader along with the cruiser , duties including acting as escort to the Battle Cruiser Force. In July 1916, intelligence reports of 
a German Merchant raider attempting to break out into the North Sea and Atlantic, resulted in a large scale operation being launched to intercept the ship, involving 14 cruisers, 13 armed merchant cruisers and 18 destroyers. As part of these operations, Gabriel and sister ship  patrolled the Fair Isle channel between the Orkneys and Shetland Islands from 11 to 13 July. Nothing was found by these operations.

On 18 March 1917, Gabriel attacked a German submarine with depth charges, without any apparent effect. She again depth charged a suspected German submarine on 30 April 1917. In May 1917, the 13th Flotilla, including Gabriel moved to Rosyth. Despite these countermeasures, the two German light cruisers  and  managed to evade the patrols and attacked the regular convoy between Norway and Britain on 17 October, sinking nine merchant ships and two destroyers,  and  before returning safely to Germany.

In mid-1918, Gabriel was converted to a minelayer, with the ability to carry 80 mines, with minesweeping paravanes fitted to provide some protection against mines when penetrating enemy minefields. Gabriel re-entered service after conversion in July 1918 with the 20th Destroyer Flotilla, a specialist destroyer minelaying flotilla based at Immingham with the role of laying mines in the Heligoland Bight, blocking German swept channels through existing minefields. Gabriel acted as leader for the "Slow Division", consisting of the older destroyers of the flotilla, while the newer faster vessels formed the "Fast Division", led by Abdiel. Gabriel took part in the ship's first offensive minelaying sortie in enemy-controlled waters on 28 September, carrying out more offensive minelaying operations on 30 September and on 2 October. In total, Gabriel had laid 850 mines by the end of the war in November 1918.

Gabriel remained in the 20th Flotilla after the end of the war, deploying with the flotilla to the Baltic in July–August 1919 as part of the British intervention in the Russian Civil War, operating from Reval (now Tallinn) in Estonia and Libau (now Liepāja) in Latvia. Duties including laying minefields to restrict the operations of the Soviet Baltic Fleet and to protect the anchorages used by the British.

While initially it was planned to repair the ship's boilers, by October it had been decided to spend no more money on Gabriel, which was laid up at Devonport.

Disposal
Gabriel was sold to T. W. Ward for £2,756 on 9 May 1921 as part of a bulk sale of obsolete warships. She was handed over for scrapping at Ward's Lelant, Cornwall yard on 20 October 1922.

Pennant numbers

Notes

Citations

References
 
 
 
 
 
 
 
 
 
 

 

Marksman-class flotilla leaders
World War I destroyers of the United Kingdom
Ships built on the River Mersey
1915 ships